Windell Gabriels Valle (born February 1, 1985 in Costa Rica) is a Costa Rican professional footballer.

Club career
Gabriels started his career at Alajuelense, making his debut against Carmelita before joining Pérez Zeledón in summer 2005.
He had a short spell at Msida Saint-Joseph in the Maltese Football League but was released in January 2010. In January 2010, Gabriels joined Universidad.

International career
Gabriels has made five appearances for the senior Costa Rica national football team, his debut coming in a friendly against New Zealand on March 24, 2007. He appeared in three matches for Costa Rica at the 2007 CONCACAF Gold Cup, his final international being their last match at that Gold Cup against Mexico.

References

External links
 
 Player profile - Nacion.com

1985 births
Living people
People from Cartago Province
Association football forwards
Costa Rican footballers
Costa Rica international footballers
2007 CONCACAF Gold Cup players
L.D. Alajuelense footballers
Municipal Pérez Zeledón footballers
Msida Saint-Joseph F.C. players
C.F. Universidad de Costa Rica footballers
Costa Rican expatriate footballers
Expatriate footballers in Malta
Liga FPD players